Arma: Armed Assault (stylized as AA; known as Arma: Combat Operations in North America) is a tactical military first- and third-person shooter, released in 2006.

Arma is the spiritual successor to Operation Flashpoint: Cold War Crisis and features an overhauled game engine, with improved graphics, physics, multiplayer functionality, scripting capabilities, and new units and vehicles. An expansion pack titled Arma: Queen's Gambit was released in 2007.

Because of legal issues between Bohemia Interactive and Codemasters (the original publishers of Operation Flashpoint), Codemasters owns the intellectual property to the name Operation Flashpoint. Since Bohemia Interactive severed its connection with Codemasters and no longer has the legal right to use the Operation Flashpoint name, Armed Assault is considered to be the direct descendant of Operation Flashpoint. Arma 2 (previously referred to as "Game 2") was released in June 2009. Codemasters has released a rival title to Bohemia Interactive using the name Operation Flashpoint: Dragon Rising, in which Bohemia Interactive has no participation.

Gameplay

The multiplayer aspect of the game features a "Join in Progress" option, so that players can play without waiting. The number of people allowed in a multiplayer game is limited only by the server's capability. NPCs are also available in multiplayer missions, both as allies and enemies, while the mission editor allows users to script battle scenarios. A cooperative mode of gameplay is also included, allowing players online to complete the single player missions as a human player squad. The Armed Assault community also creates custom content such as new missions, campaigns, factions and weapons.

A new multiplayer mode that blends FPS and RTS elements was released as Arma Warfare in the official update 1.14. Arma Warfare contains team-based multiplayer missions with realtime strategy. Two sides fight for control of the entire map or destruction of the enemy base. Players must capture whole cities to gain resources that can be channeled into manufacturing even more weapons, units and 
cars.

Plot

The campaign in Armed Assault is narrated by Private First Class William Porter of the United States Army (voiced by Todd Kramer), and takes place on the fictional Atlantic island of Sahrani, an island nation which is divided in two, with the northern section a Communist nation called the Democratic Republic of Sahrani (DRS) and the southern one an oil-rich monarchy called the Kingdom of South Sahrani. The narrative begins when American forces, after a few months of training the South Sahrani military, begin to depart the island. Prime Minister Torez, leader of the DRS, uses this moment of perceived weakness to launch a full-scale invasion of South Sahrani. The player takes on the role of an American soldier in one of the U.S. Army platoons not yet rotated off the island before the conflict began. The few U.S. Army platoons remaining on the island aid the Royal Army Corps of Sahrani (RACS), the South Sahrani military, in fending off the more powerful northern neighbor's offensive, being spearheaded by the North Sahrani military, with the Sahrani Liberation Army (SLA) at the forefront. While the SLA offensive is successful at first, U.S. Army manages to halt the offensive and starts driving the occupying forces from the southern part of the island with plans to topple the regime on the north.

The campaign follows a linear storyline. However, each level in the campaign has options for the player on how to progress through the mission. The player's in-game performance and choices determine how the storyline progresses and ultimately will have a bearing on the war itself. For example, a mission to seize a crucial town can have a substantial effect on the story depending on the player's level of success or failure. Failure to successfully complete an objective does not result in the game ending but will affect the storyline. Hostile squads act independently of the player's actions so that they may be engaging in an activity dictated by the game A.I. that does not necessarily involve the player. This implies that the game has high replay value as no two games will be identical.

Expansion

Arma'''s expansion pack, Arma: Queen's Gambit (also known as Royal Flush in the USA), was released on September 28, 2007 and contained a followup to the original storyline and added a second event afterward.

ReceptionArma received average reception on its release, praised for the unique believability of its action but criticized for its difficulty, complexity, and bugs. IGN said "Arma's adherence to realism and accuracy in terms of weapons and world design is highly commendable and hopefully will inspire other developers in similar directions." GameDaily praised its "spectacular graphics" and its multiplayer, but criticized its bugs and "complicated menu system". Computer Games Online said "It’s hard...to believe that they actually thought that such an unpolished game would enjoy any kind of success."

The game has sold 300,000 units as of 28 February 2008. By 2010, sales has surpassed 400,000 copies.

Sequel

The sequel, Arma 2'', is a standalone military simulation video game for Microsoft Windows that was released in June 2009 using the Real Virtuality game engine. A well known mod DayZ was released on this title, it requires the standalone expansion pack game titled Arma 2: Operation Arrowhead.

References

External links 
Official website via Internet Archive
Official U.S. website
Bohemia Interactive Wiki

2006 video games
505 Games games
Bohemia Interactive games
Cooperative video games
First-person shooters
Multiplayer and single-player video games
Tactical shooter video games
Third-person shooters
Video games developed in the Czech Republic
Video games with expansion packs
Video games with user-generated gameplay content
Video games set on islands
War video games
Windows games
Windows-only games
Arma (series)
Multiplayer vehicle operation games